Lee Mi-Young (born January 28, 1969) is a South Korean team handball player and Olympic champion.

She participated at the 1988 Summer Olympics in Seoul, and received a gold medal with the Korean team.

She competed at the 1992 Summer Olympics in Barcelona, where she again received a gold medal. At the 1992 Olympics Lee was ranked 3rd in goals, scoring 23 goals in 5 games, and she was eventually named to the All-Star Team of the competition.

After the 1992 Olympics, she retired from pro handball, and is currently working as a librarian in Ansan, Gyeonggi-do, South Korea.

References

External links

1969 births
Living people
South Korean female handball players
Olympic handball players of South Korea
Handball players at the 1988 Summer Olympics
Handball players at the 1992 Summer Olympics
Olympic gold medalists for South Korea
Olympic medalists in handball
Asian Games medalists in handball
Handball players at the 1990 Asian Games
Medalists at the 1992 Summer Olympics
Medalists at the 1988 Summer Olympics
Asian Games gold medalists for South Korea
Medalists at the 1990 Asian Games